During the 2002–03 English football season, Newcastle United F.C. participated in the FA Premier League (known as the FA Barclaycard Premiership for sponsorship reasons).

Season summary
After a slow start, the club began putting together the wins and, by the end of March, were in a three-way title race with Manchester United and Arsenal. Consecutive defeats to a resurgent Everton and a 6–2 home thrashing by Alex Ferguson's side killed off Newcastle's title hopes, but Bobby Robson and his team was able to brush off the challenge from Chelsea to finish 3rd in the Premier League, entering the qualification rounds for the Champions League in the 2003–04 season.

The 2002–03 season was a particularly colourful one for Newcastle on the European stage. In the first group stage, Newcastle lost their first three matches in a row, then, in an astonishing reversal, shocked Italian giants Juventus 1–0 at St James' Park. They then controversially beat Dynamo Kyiv 2–1 in Newcastle before winning the crucial last match, away to Feyenoord, 3–2 in injury time, with striker Craig Bellamy scoring the injury time winner. With Dynamo Kyiv losing at home to Juventus, Newcastle progressed to the second round, in a 'group of death' with Internazionale, Barcelona and Bayer Leverkusen.

Bellamy was sent off for lashing out at Inter defender Marco Materazzi in an off-the-ball incident during the opening minutes of the match. Bellamy was punished further by a three-match ban. Compounding the disaster for Newcastle was the suspension of influential captain Alan Shearer for a similar incident, although the punishment was just a two-match ban. Newcastle went on to lose 1–4 at home.

Shearer returned in the fourth game in the 4-team group, scoring all three goals in a 3–1 demolition of Bayer Leverkusen at home. Despite a superb performance against Inter in the famous San Siro, only to draw 2–2, Newcastle lost at home 2–0 to Barcelona and dropped out of the Champions League.

Final league table

Team kit
The team kit for the 2002–03 season was produced by Adidas and the main shirt sponsor was NTL.

Transfers

In

 Total spending:  £23.5m

Out

 Total spending:  £150,000

Players

First-team squad
Squad at end of season

Left club during season

Reserve squad
The following players did not appear for the first-team this season.

Trialists

Coaching staff

Appearances, goals and cards
(Starting appearances + substitute appearances)

Matches

Pre-season

Premier League

Champions League

FA Cup

League Cup

References

External links
FootballSquads - Newcastle United - 2002/03

Newcastle United F.C. seasons
Newcastle United